Montpellier is a city in southern France near the Mediterranean Sea. One of the largest urban centres in the region of Occitania, Montpellier is the prefecture of the department of Hérault. At the 2020 census, 299,096 people lived in the city proper, while its metropolitan area had a population of 813,272. The inhabitants are called Montpelliérains.

In the Middle Ages, Montpellier was an important city of the Crown of Aragon (and was the birthplace of James I), and then of Majorca, before its sale to France in 1349. Established in 1220, the University of Montpellier is one of the oldest universities in the world and oldest medical school still in operation, with notable alumni such as Petrarch, Nostradamus and François Rabelais. Above the medieval city, the ancient citadel of Montpellier is a stronghold built in the seventeenth century by Louis XIII of France.

Since the 1990s, Montpellier has experienced one of the strongest economic and demographic growth in the country. Its urban area has experienced the highest population growth in France since the year 2000. Numbering 70,000, students comprise nearly one-fourth of its population, one of the highest such proportions in Europe. Its living environment with one of Europe's largest pedestrian area, along with its rich cultural life and Mediterranean climate, explain the enthusiasm for the city, which is nicknamed the "Gifted". Montpellier was nominated for "Best Emerging Culture City of the Year 2017" by the think tank LCD. It is ranked as a Sufficiency city by the Globalization and World Cities Research Network.

Status
Montpellier is the third-largest French city near the Mediterranean coast, behind Marseille and Nice. It is the seventh-largest city of France, and is also the fastest-growing city in the country over the past 25 years.

History

Medieval period

In the Early Middle Ages, the nearby episcopal town of Maguelone was the major settlement in the area, but raids by pirates encouraged settlement a little farther inland. Montpellier, first mentioned in a document of 985, was founded under a local feudal dynasty, the Guilhem, who combined two hamlets and built a castle and walls around the united settlement. The name is from medieval Latin mons pisleri, "Woad Mountain" referring to the woad (Latin pastellus, pestellus) used for dyeing locally. There is no real "mountain" in the area, with the mons referring to a pile of stones. The two surviving towers of the city walls, the Tour des Pins and the Tour de la Babotte, were built later, around the year 1200. Montpellier came to prominence in the 12th century—as a trading centre, with trading links across the Mediterranean world, and a rich Jewish cultural life that flourished within traditions of tolerance of Muslims, Jews and Cathars—and later of its Protestants. William VIII of Montpellier gave freedom for all to teach medicine in Montpellier in 1180. The city's faculties of law and medicine were established in 1220 by Cardinal Conrad of Urach, legate of Pope Honorius III; the medical faculty has, over the centuries, been one of the major centres for the teaching of medicine in Europe. This era marked the high point of Montpellier's prominence. The city became a possession of the Kings of Aragon in 1204 by the marriage of Peter II of Aragon with Marie of Montpellier, who was given the city and its dependencies as part of her dowry.Montpellier gained a charter in 1204 when Peter and Marie confirmed the city's traditional freedoms and granted the city the right to choose twelve governing consuls annually. Under the Kings of Aragon, Montpellier became a very important city, a major economic centre and the primary centre for the spice trade in the Kingdom of France. It was the second or third most important city of France at that time, with some 40,000 inhabitants before the Black Death. Montpellier remained a possession of the crown of Aragon until it passed to James III of Majorca, who sold the city to the French king Philip VI in 1349, to raise funds for his ongoing struggle with Peter IV of Aragon. In the 14th century, Pope Urban VIII gave Montpellier a new monastery dedicated to Saint Peter, noteworthy for the very unusual porch of its chapel, supported by two high, somewhat rocket-like towers. With its importance steadily increasing, the city finally gained a bishop, who moved from Maguelone in 1536, and the huge monastery chapel became a cathedral. In 1432, Jacques Cœur established himself in the city and it became an important economic centre, until 1481 when Marseilles overshadowed it in this role.

From the middle of the 14th century until the French Revolution (1789), Montpellier was part of the province of Languedoc.

After the Reformation

At the time of the Reformation in the 16th century, many of the inhabitants of Montpellier became Protestants (or Huguenots as they were known in France) and the city became a stronghold of Protestant resistance to the Catholic French crown. In 1622, King Louis XIII besieged the city which surrendered after a two-month siege (Siege of Montpellier), afterwards building the Citadel of Montpellier to secure it. Louis XIV made Montpellier capital of Bas Languedoc, and the town started to embellish itself, by building the Promenade du Peyrou, the Esplanade and a large number of houses in the historic centre. After the French Revolution, the city became the capital of the much smaller Hérault.

Modern history

During the 19th century the city thrived on the wine culture that it was able to produce due to the abundance of sun throughout the year. The wine consumption in France allowed Montpellier's citizens to become very wealthy until in the 1890s the phylloxera induced fungal disease had spread amongst the vineyards and the people were no longer able to grow the grapes needed for wine. After this the city had grown because it welcomed immigrants from Algeria and other parts of northern Africa after Algeria's independence from France. In the 21st century Montpellier is between France's number seventh and eighth largest city. The city had another influx in population more recently, largely due to the student population, who make up about one-third of Montpellier's population. The school of medicine kickstarted the city's thriving university culture, though many other universities have been well established there. The coastal city also benefited in the past 40 years from major construction programs such as Antigone, Port Marianne and Odysseum districts.

Geography

The name of the city, which was originally Monspessulanus, is said to have stood for mont pelé (the naked hill, because the vegetation was poor), or le mont de la colline (the mount of the hill).

The city is built on two hills, Montpellier and Montpelliéret, thus some of its streets have great differences of altitude. Some of its streets are also very narrow and old, which gives it a more intimate feel.

Climate
Montpellier has a Mediterranean climate (Köppen Csa), with cool, damp winters, and hot, rather dry summers.

Neighbourhoods 

Since 2001, Montpellier has been divided into seven official neighbourhoods, themselves divided into sub-neighbourhoods. Each of them possesses a neighbourhood council.

 Montpellier-centre : historical centre (Écusson), Comédie, Gares, Faubourg Boutonnet, Saint-Charles, Faubourg Saint-Jaume, Peyrou, Les Arceaux, Figuerolles, Faubourg du Courreau, Gambetta, Clémenceau, Méditerranée, boulevard de Strasbourg, Le Triangle, Polygone, Antigone, Nouveau-Monde, Parc à Ballons, Les Aubes, Les Beaux-Arts, Saint-Lazare.
 Croix-d'Argent : avenue de Toulouse, Croix d'Argent, Mas Drevon, Tastavin, Lemasson, Garosud, Mas de Bagnères, Mas Nouguier, les Sabines, Lepic, Pas du Loup, Estanove, les Bouisses, Val-de-Crozes, Bagatelle.
 Les Cévennes : Les Cévennes, Alco, Le Petit Bard, Pergola, Saint-Clément, Clémentville, Las Rebès, La Chamberte, La Martelle, Montpellier-Village, Les Grisettes, Les Grèzes.
 Mosson : La Mosson, Celleneuve, La Paillade, les Hauts-de-Massane, Le Grand-Mail, Les Tritons.
 Hôpitaux-Facultés : Malbosc, Saint-Priest, Euromédecine, Zolad, Plan des 4 Seigneurs, Hôpitaux, IUT, Père Soulas, Universités, Vert-Bois, Hauts de Boutonnet, Aiguelongue, Justice, Parc zoologique de Lunaret, Agropolis.
 Port-Marianne : La Pompignane, Richter, Millénaire, Jacques Cœur, Consuls de Mer, Grammont, Odysseum, Montaubérou, La Méjanelle, Cambacérès.
 Prés d'Arènes : Les Prés d'Arènes, Avenue de Palavas, La Rauze, Tournezy, Saint-Martin, Les Aiguerelles, Pont-Trinquat, Cité Mion.

Population

The whole metropolitan area had a population of 813,272 at the 2020 census. In a study made by INSEE from 2007 to 2012 Montpellier saw the strongest population growth of France's main communes (+1.1%), ahead of Paris and Lyon. For most of its history, and even today, Montpellier is known for its significant Spanish population, heritage and influence. Montpellier also houses significant Occitan, Moroccan, Algerian, and Italian communities.

Heraldry

Sights

 The main focus point of the city is the Place de la Comédie, with the Opéra Comédie built in 1888.
 The Musée Fabre.
 In the historic centre, a significant number of hôtels particuliers (i.e. mansions) can be found. The majority of the buildings of the historic centre of Montpellier (called the Écusson because its shape is roughly that of an escutcheon) have medieval roots and were modified between the 16th and the 18th centuries. Some buildings, along Rue Foch and the Place de la Comédie, were built in the 19th century.
 The Rue du Bras de Fer (Iron Arm Street) is very typical of the medieval Montpellier.
 The mikve, ritual Jewish bath, dates back to the 12th century and is one of very few old mikves preserved in Europe.
 The Jardin des plantes de Montpellier—oldest botanical garden in France, founded in 1593
 The La Serre Amazonienne, a tropical rain forest greenhouse
 The 14th-century Saint Pierre Cathedral
 The Porte du Peyrou, a triumphal arch built at the end of the 17th century, and the Place Royal du Peyrou built in the 17th century, are the highest point of the Ecusson.
 The Tour des Pins, the only remaining of 25 towers of the city medieval walls, built around 1200.
 The Tour de la Babotte, a medieval tower which was modified in the 18th century to house an observatory.
 The Saint Clément Aqueduct, built in the 18th century.
 The Antigone District was designed by the postmodern architect Ricardo Bofill from Catalonia, Spain
 A number of châteaux (such as Château de Flaugergues, Château de la Mogère or Château d'O), so-called follies, built during the 18th century by wealthy merchants surround the city
 Nearly 80 private mansions were built in the city center from the 17th to 19th century, and some of their interior courtyards are open

Education

History

The University of Montpellier is one of the oldest in the world, founded in 1160, and having been granted a charter in 1220 by Cardinal Conrad von Urach and confirmed by Pope Nicholas IV in a papal bull of 1289. It was suppressed during the French Revolution but was
re-established in 1896.

It is not known exactly at what date the schools of literature were founded which developed into the Montpellier faculty of arts; it may be that they were a direct continuation of the Gallo-Roman schools. The school of law was founded by Placentinus, a doctor from Bologna University, who came to Montpellier in 1160, taught there during two different periods, and died there in 1192. With regard to the school of medicine, there were excellent physicians at Montpellier. The statutes given in 1220 by Cardinal Conrad, legate of Honorius III, which were completed in 1240 by Pierre de Conques, placed this school under the direction of the Bishop of Maguelonne. Pope Nicholas IV issued a Bull in 1289, combining all the schools into a university, which was placed under the direction of the bishop, but which in fact enjoyed a large measure of autonomy.

Theology was at first taught in the convents, in which St. Anthony of Padua, Raymond Lullus, and the Dominican Bernard de la Treille lectured. Two letters of King John prove that a faculty of theology existed at Montpellier independently of the convents, in January 1350. By a Bull of 17 December 1421, Martin V granted canonical institution to this faculty and united it closely with the faculty of law. In the 16th century the faculty of theology disappeared for a time, when Calvinism, in the reign of Henry II of France, held complete possession of the city. It resumed its functions after Louis XIII had reestablished the royal power at Montpellier in 1622; but the rivalries of Dominicans and Jesuits interfered seriously with the prosperity of the faculty, which disappeared at the Revolution. The faculty numbered among its illustrious pupils of law Petrarch, who spent four years at Montpellier, and among its lecturers Guillaume de Nogaret, chancellor to Philip the Fair, Guillaume de Grimoard, afterwards pope under the name of Urban V, and Pedro de Luna, antipope as Benedict XIII. But after the 15th century this faculty fell into decay, as did also the faculty of arts, although for a time, under Henry IV of France, the latter faculty had among its lecturers Casaubon.

The Montpellier school of medicine owed its success to the ruling of the Guilhems, lords of the town, by which any licensed physician might lecture there; there was no fixed limit to the number of teachers, lectures were multiplied, and there was a great wealth of teaching. Rabelais took his medical degrees at Montpellier. It was in this school that the biological theory of vitalism, elaborated by Barthez (1734–1806), had its origin. The French Revolution did not interrupt the existence of the faculty of medicine.

The faculties of science and of letters were re-established in 1810; that of law in 1880. It was on the occasion of the sixth centenary of the university, celebrated in 1889, that the Government of France announced its intention—which has since been realized—of reorganizing the provincial universities in France.

Universities
 University of Montpellier: sciences, medicine, dentistry, pharmacy, law, business, sports 
 Paul Valéry University: arts, languages and social sciences

University of Montpellier 1 and University of Montpellier 2 reunified in January 2015 to form the University of Montpellier. Paul Valéry University Montpellier, remains a separate entity.

Moreover, Montpellier was ranked 119th best student city in the world for 2013, according to QS Best Student Cities 2023 ranking.

Grandes Ecoles

 Science
 E-Artsup
 École Polytechnique Universitaire de Montpellier (Polytech)
 National Superior Architecture School of Montpellier (ENSAM)
 École nationale de l'aviation civile
 ENSCM: chemistry
 École pour l'informatique et les nouvelles technologies
 Institut supérieur européen de formation par l'action
 Montpellier SupAgro: agronomy
 SUPINFO International University: private institution of higher education in general Computer Science

 Business
 Montpellier Business School
  SupExup Higher Education Institute

Transport

Montpellier is served by railway, including TGV highspeed trains. Montpellier's main railway station is Saint-Roch. Since 2018, there is also a station on the high-speed railway linking Nîmes and Montpellier with the LGV Méditerranée, called Montpellier-Sud de France.

The Montpellier – Méditerranée Airport is located in the area of Fréjorgues, in the town of Mauguio, southeast of Montpellier.

The Transports de l'agglomération de Montpellier (TaM) manages the city's public transportation, including its  tramway network consisting of four lines and several parking facilities. Line 1 runs from Mosson in the west to Odysseum in the east. Line 2 runs from Jacou in the northeast to St. Jean-de-Vedas in the southwest. Line 3 and Line 4 opened in April 2012. Line 4 circles the centre and serves as a connector line between the various arms of tram system. They intersect at Gare St. Roch station, Rives du Lez and Corum.

The TaM also manages the large bike sharing scheme Vélomagg', started in June 2007, comprising 1200 bicycles and 50 stations.

Sport

Montpellier was the finish of Stage 11 and the departure of Stage 12 in the 2007 Tour de France.  It was also the finish of Stage 11 and the departure of Stage 12 in the 2016 edition. The city is home to a variety of professional sports teams:

 Montpellier Hérault Rugby, of the Top 14 who play rugby union formerly at the Stade Sabathé and now at the Altrad Stadium. In the 2010/2011 season, the team made it to the Top 14 Final against the Stade Toulousain.
 Montpellier HSC of Ligue 1 who play association football at the Stade de la Mosson. MHSC became French Champions on 20 May 2012.
 Montpellier Red Devils who play rugby league in Elite 1 division at the Stade Sabathé
 Montpellier Agglomération Handball are a team handball club playing in the French National League.
 Montpellier Hérault Sport Club Volley-Ball who play in the LNV Ligue A and have 8 National titles, last in 2021-22 season.
 Montpellier Vipers of France's Division 1 ice hockey Federation, play at the Patinoire de l'Agglomération de Montpellier at Odysseum
 Montpellier Water Polo play in the National League and European Cup competitions.
 Barracudas de Montpellier is a baseball club, and competes in Division Élite, a French top level baseball league.

Montpellier was one of the hosts of the FIBA EuroBasket 2015.

The city is home to the Open Sud de France tennis tournament since 2010, and will host the XXXI World Rhythmic Gymnastics Championship.

The main athletics stadium is the Philippidès Stadium, which is owned by the University of Montpellier.

Culture
The city is a centre for cultural events as there are many students. Montpellier has two large concert venues: Le Zenith Sud (7.000 seats) and L'Arena (14.000 seats). Le Corum cultural and conference centre contains three auditoriums.

 The Festival de Radio France et Montpellier is a summer festival of opera and other music held in Montpellier. The festival concentrates on classical music and jazz with about 150 events, including opera, concerts, films, and talks. Most of these events are free and are held in the historic courtyards of the city or in the modern concert halls of Le Corum near historical city center.
 The annual Cinemed, the International Mediterranean Film Festival Montpellier, held in the fall, is the second largest French film festival after the Cannes Film Festival. Held since 1979, it offers screenings of over 200 long and short films, documentaries, animated films, trailers, and a special program of student films. Other events include panel discussions, exhibitions, and gatherings. Venues include Le Corum and cinema halls.

International relations

Montpellier is twinned with:

 Barcelona, Spain since 1963
 Bethlehem, Palestine, since 2012
 Chengdu, China, since 1981
 Fes, Morocco since 2003
 Heidelberg, Germany, since 1961
 Kos, Greece, since 1962
 Louisville, United States, since 1955
 Obninsk, Russia, since 2017
 Palermo, Italy, since 2016
 Rio de Janeiro, Brazil since 2011
 Sherbrooke, Canada, since 2006
 Tiberias, Israel, since 1983
 Tlemcen, Algeria, since 2009

Notable people 

Montpellier was the birthplace of:
 Abraham ben Isaac of Narbonne (c. 1110–1179), rabbi and author of the halakhic work Ha-Eshkol
 James I of Aragon (1208–1276) King of Aragon and Lord of Montpellier from 1213 to 1276.
 Nicholas of Poland (c.1235-c.1316), Dominican healer
 Saint Roch (1295–1327), pilgrim to Rome, venerated as a saint by the Roman Catholic Church.
 Pierre Magnol (1638–1715), botanist, founder of the concept of plant families
 Charles Bertheau (1660–1732), French pastor
 Jean Raoux (1677–1734), painter.
 Louis Bertrand Castel (1688–1757) mathematician, entered the order of the Jesuits in 1703.
 Pons Augustin Alletz (1703–1785), agronomist
 Joseph-Marie Vien (1716–1809), painter.
 Étienne-Hyacinthe de Ratte (1722–1805), mathematician and astronomer
 Suzanne Verdier (1745–1813), writer
 Cyrille Rigaud (1750–1824), poet
 Jean Jacques Régis de Cambacérès (1753–1824), lawyer and statesman, author of the Code Napoléon.
 Guillaume-Mathieu Dumas (1753–1837), military leader.
 Louis-Sébastien Lenormand (1757–1837), chemist, physicist, inventor, the world's first modern parachuting pioneer
 Pierre Marie Auguste Broussonet (1761–1807), naturalist, contributed primarily to botany. 
 Pierre Antoine Noël Bruno, Comte de Daru (1767–1829), soldier, statesman, historian and poet.
 Laure Junot, Duchess of Abrantès (1784–1838), writer and spouse of French general Jean-Andoche Junot.
 Joseph Frédéric Bérard (1789–1828), physician and philosopher. 
 Auguste Comte (1798–1857), a founder of the discipline of sociology
 Antoine Jérôme Balard (1802–1876), chemist.
 Émile Saisset (1814–1863), philosopher.
 Charles Bernard Renouvier (1815–1903), philosopher.
 Édouard Albert Roche (1820–1883), astronomer
 Alfred Bruyas (1821–1876), art collector
 Alexandre Cabanel (1823–1889), painter.
 Renaud de Vilbac (1829–1884), composer, organist
 Frédéric Bazille (1841–1870), Impressionist painter
 Eugène Baudouin (1842–1893), painter
 Paul Ferrier (1843-1920) dramatist, he also provided libretti for several composers.
 Henri Chantavoine (1850–1918), writer and Professor of Rhetoric.
 Henri-Charles Puech (1902–1986), historian of religion
 Léo Malet (1909–1996), crime novelist
 Henri Carol (1910–1984), French composer and organist
 Adèle Charvet (born 1993), operatic mezzo-soprano
 Jeanne Demessieux (1921–1968), organist, pianist, composer, and pedagogue
 Monique de Bissy, member of the Resistance during World War II (1923–2009)
 Juliette Gréco (1927-2020), singer and actress
 Jean-Luc Dehaene (1940–2014), Prime-Minister of Belgium
 Didier Auriol (born 1958), rally driver, 1994 World Rally Champion
 Rémi Gaillard (born 1975), famous French prankster
 Sophie Divry (born 1979), writer, winner of the 2014 Prix Wepler

Other famous inhabitants include:
 François Rabelais (1493–1553), student at the University of Montpellier.
 Nostradamus (1503–1566), student at the University of Montpellier.
 Iacob Heraclid, (1527–1563), ruler of Moldavia from 1561 to 1563
 Pierre-Joseph Amoreux (1741–1824), zoologist
 Adamantios Korais (1748–1833), Greek humanist scholar and a major figure in the Greek Enlightenment, studied at the University of Montpellier.
 Jean-Louis Michel (1785–1865), fencing master, who lived in Montpellier from 1830 onwards
 Agénor Azéma de Montgravier (1805–1863), deputy director of l'Ecole d'Artillerie de Montpellier, died in Montpellier
 Gaston Darboux (1842–1917), mathematician
 Josias Braun-Blanquet (1884–1980), botanist
 Jean Moulin (1899–1943), famous French resistant during WWII, studied and worked in Montpellier
 Alexander Grothendieck (1928–2014), mathematician
 Nikola Karabatić (born 1984), handball player
 Paul Valéry (1871–1945), student at the University of Montpellier
 Enver Hoxha (1908–1985), student at the University of Montpellier
 Grégory Vignal (born 1981), Birmingham City F.C. full-back
 Taha Hussein (1889–1973), student at the University of Montpellier
 Michel Navratil (1908–2001), survivor of the sinking of the RMS Titanic
 Guy Delisle (born 1966), Canadian-born cartoonist, animator and author

Other locations named after Montpellier
"Montpellier" is used as the name of other towns and streets in as many as four continents. Many places in England, Scotland, Wales and Ireland carry the name Montpellier. Often they are in resort locations claiming some of the healthy attributes for which the French city was renowned in earlier centuries. The variant spelling "Montpelier" is common, and is of quite early provenance. Brewer uses that spelling. The first example was the early 19th-century suburb of Montpelier in Brighton.

The capital of the American state of Vermont was named Montpelier because of the high regard in which the Americans held the French who had aided their Revolutionary War against the British. Several other American cities are also named Montpelier.

Places named Montpellier/Montpelier are also found in Australia, Canada, South Africa, and the Caribbean.

James Madison, the United States fourth president, named his plantation Montpelier (Orange, Virginia), after the resort-like properties associated with the city at the time.

See also
 Communes of the Hérault department
 Roman Catholic Archdiocese of Montpellier

References

Citations

Sources

Further reading

External links

 Official website

 
Communes of Hérault
Cities in Occitania (administrative region)
Prefectures in France
Crown of Aragon
Languedoc
Cities in France